Robert Gerald Turner (born November 25, 1945) is the President of Southern Methodist University (SMU) in Dallas, Texas. One of the most highly-compensated university presidents in the United States, Turner has been hailed as a "transformational" figure who helped rehabilitate SMU's national reputation following the infamous 1980s football scandal and NCAA death penalty. His tenure as president, the longest in SMU history, has also been marked by legal confirmation of the university's independence from the United Methodist Church, unprecedented campus expansion and building, and record-breaking capital campaigns, as SMU's endowment surpassed $1 billion.

At the same time, Turner has drawn criticism for failing to translate his fundraising prowess into significant improvements in the national rankings of SMU and its constituent colleges. Further, Turner has courted controversy for his decision to bring the George W. Bush Presidential Center to SMU, and, more recently, the university's response to the COVID-19 pandemic.

Before coming to SMU, Turner served as Chancellor of the University of Mississippi ("Ole Miss") from 1984 to 1995. Under his leadership, Ole Miss increased its endowment from $8 million to $64 million.

Early life and education
R. Gerald Turner was born in 1945 in New Boston, Texas. He received an A.A. from Lubbock Christian College, and graduated from Abilene Christian University with a B.S. in Psychology in 1968. He then graduated from the University of Texas at Austin with an M.A. and a Ph.D.

Career
From 1975 to 1979, Turner was a professor at Pepperdine University at Malibu, California. He was the vice president of the University of Oklahoma from 1979 to 1984.

Turner served as the chancellor of the University of Mississippi from 1984 to 1995. At 38, Turner was considered among the youngest university presidents. While at Ole Miss, he fired Billy Brewer, the longtime popular football coach, due to allegations of recruiting violations. Successful programs under Turner's leadership grew the school's endowment from $8 million to $64 million.

Since 1995, Turner has served as the president of Southern Methodist University. He helped lead the school's efforts to attract the George W. Bush Presidential Center, to be located on the SMU campus. In 2016, he earned $3.3 million, and was the third-highest-paid of all U.S. private-university presidents. In 2008, he earned $2.7 million.

Turner was co-Chair of the Knight Commission on Intercollegiate Athletics and Chair of the National Collegiate Athletic Association Subcommittee on Presidential Leadership of Internal and External Constituencies. He serves on the boards of the Methodist Hospital Foundation and the Salvation Army of Dallas, and has served on the boards of United Way of Dallas, the First Broadcasting Corporation, J. C. Penney (where he was part of the critical decision to change J.C. Penney's century old sales and discount program), Kronos Worldwide, American Beacon Funds, California Federal Preferred Capital Corporation, American Advantage Funds, Skytel Communications, ChemFirst Inc, the ChemFirst Foundation, AMFM, the First Mississippi Corporation, etc.

Personal life
Turner and his wife, Gail, a native of Graham, Texas, have two married daughters. He is a member of the Churches of Christ.

See also
Institute of Child Nutrition

References

External links

C-SPAN Q&A interview with Turner, February 13, 2011

1946 births
Living people
American members of the Churches of Christ
Abilene Christian University alumni
Lubbock Christian University alumni
University of Texas at Austin alumni
University of Oklahoma people
Chancellors of the University of Mississippi
Presidents of Southern Methodist University
People from New Boston, Texas